Morris John Stevenson (16 April 1943 – 22 July 2014) was a Scottish footballer who played as a forward.

Career 
Stevenson began his professional career in 1960 with Motherwell and played in twelve league matches over a two-year period. A 1962 move to Hibernian saw him feature twenty times but leave within a year for Morton. It was with Morton that Stevenson would spend half his career and make the majority of his career appearances, playing in over 160 league matches and scoring twenty-six goals. After six years at Cappielow, Stevenson moved south to Luton Town but played just once and quickly returned north, this time with Dundee United. After three years at Tannadice, Stevenson finished his career with a handful of appearances for Berwick Rangers.

References

External links
 
 Hibernian Historical Trust

1943 births
2014 deaths
Scottish footballers
Motherwell F.C. players
Hibernian F.C. players
Greenock Morton F.C. players
Luton Town F.C. players
Dundee United F.C. players
Berwick Rangers F.C. players
People from Tranent
Scottish Football League players
English Football League players
Association football inside forwards
Footballers from East Lothian